Filippos Sachinidis (born 1963) is a Greek politician of the Movement for Change. Elected on the list of his former party PASOK, he served as a Member of the Hellenic Parliament from 2007 to 2014. In 2012, he briefly served as Minister of Finance in the Coalition Cabinet of Lucas Papademos.

Early life and education
Born in Canada to ethnic Greek parents in 1963, Sachinidis grew up in Larisa. He studied Economics at the University of Piraeus and received his Master of Arts in Economics from City College of New York. In 1994, he received a Ph.D. from the University of Manchester in the United Kingdom.

Career
Sachinidis is an economist for the National Bank of Greece and served as an economic advisor to Greek Prime Minister Costas Simitis from 2000 to 2004. In 2007, Sachinidis was elected on the list of the Panhellenic Socialist Movement (PASOK) to represent the Larissa constituency in the Hellenic Parliament. He was reelected in 2009 and twice in 2012.

Following the victory of PASOK in the national elections of 2009, he was made Deputy Minister of Finance under George Papaconstantnou. On 17 June 2011, Sachinidis was appointed Alternate Minister of Finance under Evangelos Venizelos. When Venizelos resigned on 21 March 2012, Sachinidis became Minister of Finance under Prime Minister Lucas Papademos, serving until May 17, 2012.

On 3 January 2015, it was announced that Sachinidis would join former prime minister Papandreou in leaving PASOK to found the new Movement of Democratic Socialists. Sachinidis and George Petalotis were appointed the media representatives of the new party.

Sachinidis is a member of Movement for Change since its inception.

Personal life
Sachinidis is married to Rania Karageorgou and they have one son, Dimitris.

References

External links
 
 Personal profile on the website of the Hellenic Parliament

1963 births
Alumni of the University of Manchester
Canadian people of Greek descent
City College of New York alumni
Finance ministers of Greece
20th-century Greek economists
Greek government-debt crisis
Greek MPs 2007–2009
Greek MPs 2009–2012
Greek MPs 2012 (May)
Greek MPs 2012–2014
Living people
Movement of Democratic Socialists politicians
PASOK politicians
Politicians from Larissa
21st-century Greek economists